The Great West Conference Men's Basketball Player of the Year was an annual basketball award given to the Great West Conference's (GWC) most outstanding player. The award was first given following the 2009–10 season, the conference's first as a member of NCAA Division I. The GWC was officially formed on February 25, 2004 as a football-only conference. On July 10, 2008, it was announced that the GWC would change from a football-only conference into an all-sports conference. The following season (2008–09) competition began in a limited number of other sports such as track and field, cross country and golf. Due to massive conference-switching by dozens of Division I schools during the 2010–13 NCAA conference realignment, the Great West Conference officially disbanded on July 1, 2013, after all but New Jersey Institute of Technology departed.

Tyler Cain, a  senior power forward from the University of South Dakota, was the first-ever Great West Men's Basketball Player of the Year.

Winners

Winners by school

Footnotes
  The University of South Dakota joined The Summit League in 2011–12.
  The University of North Dakota left after the 2011–12 season for the Big Sky Conference.

References

NCAA Division I men's basketball conference players of the year
Player
Awards established in 2010
Awards disestablished in 2013